Angelo Leonel Vega Rodriguez (born 3 January 1985) is a Chilean-born Swedish international futsal player and a former football player.

Futsal
Vega plays Futsal for Gothenburg team FC Ibra and for the Swedish national team.

International
He made his international Futsal debut for Sweden on December 11, 2012 against France.

Personal life
Vega was born in Valparaíso, Chile, and moved to Uddevalla, Sweden, at the age of three along with his family. Later, he naturalized Swedish by residence.

References

External links
 
 Profile at Fotbolltransfers.com 
 svenskalag.se 
 Angelo Vega at Soccer-Talents.com

1985 births
Living people
Sportspeople from Valparaíso
Naturalized citizens of Sweden
Swedish footballers
Sportspeople of Chilean descent
Örgryte IS players
Qviding FIF players
IK Oddevold players
Association football midfielders
Swedish men's futsal players
Swedish international futsal players
FC Ibra players